Phil Barney (real name : Philippe Baranès, born February 2, 1957, in Annaba, Algeria) is a French singer-songwriter. He was particularly successful with his 1987 song "Un Enfant de toi".

Biography
In the 1980s, Phil Barney had several success on the French Singles Chart, including the big hit "Un Enfant de toi", his first single, which was a number three hit in November 1987. "Avec qui tu vis", "Tellement je pense à toi", "Il est parti" and "Loin de tes bras" were among his other singles, but they achieved a moderate success in comparison with his debut single. Most of his songs are pop ballads related with romantic themes. However, throughout his career, Barney changed his musical style and also recorded rap songs.

He published several studio albums, but the last ones passed almost unnoticed. In 2002, he covered his 1987 hit in a duet version with Marlène Duval and obtained a huge success since the song became a number-one single, but this notoriety remained temporary and he fell again into anonymity after this come back. In 2012, ha was on stage with Philippe Cataldo, Joniece Jamison and DJ Cyprien Rose for the opening of a new concert hall, the Mood's, in Paris.

Discography

Albums
 1987 : Recto-verseau
 1990 : Tour d'ivoire
 1992 : Carnets de route
 1995 : Partager tout
 1996 : Histoire confidentielles - #30 in Belgium
 1998 : Voleurs de rêve
 2002 : C'est promis

Singles
 1987 : "Un Enfant de toi" - #3 in France
 1988 : "Avec qui tu vis" - #23 in France
 1991 : "Tellement je pense à toi" - #32 in France
 1991 : "Il est parti" - #36 in France
 1992 : "Loin de tes bras" - #40 in France
 2002 : "Un Enfant de toi" - #1 in France, #1 in Belgium

Other songs
 "Celui qui passe"
 "Chanson désenchantée"
 "Comédie d'amour"
 "Histoire confidentielle"
 "J'ai fait un rêve"
 "J'voudrai qu'on reste amis"
 "Le Souvenir de toi"
 "Ma vie c'est la musique"
 "Mrs Jones"
 "Nouveau monde"
 "Partager tout"
 "Seul"
 "Tour d'ivoire"
 "Un cœur qui danse"
 "Voleurs de rêves"

References

External links
 Official site

1957 births
Pieds-Noirs
French male singers
French pop singers
Living people
People from Annaba